Marcelle Eugene Bruce (born 15 March 1971) is an American former soccer player who played as a defender in the Football League for Colchester United.

Career 

Born in Detroit, Michigan, Bruce began his career with English Football League club Colchester United. He made his debut for the first-team aged 18 in a 2–1 home defeat to Cambridge United on 10 November 1989. He scored his only professional goal for the club and the only goal of the game in a victory over Grimsby Town on 20 February 1990. Bruce made 29 league appearances for Colchester in the 1989–90 season, but could not help the club avoid relegation from the Football League to the Football Conference. He made four appearances in the Conference, and played his final game for the U's in a 2–0 Conference League Cup defeat to Sutton United on 26 February 1991.

Following his exit from Colchester, Bruce teamed up with non-league outfits Baldock Town and Hemel Hempstead Town.

References

1971 births
Living people
Soccer players from Detroit
American expatriate soccer players
American expatriate sportspeople in England
Expatriate footballers in England
Colchester United F.C. players
Baldock Town F.C. players
Hemel Hempstead Town F.C. players
English Football League players
American soccer players
Association football defenders